Steven Donnelly (born 7 September 1988) is an Irish professional boxer from Northern Ireland who represented Ireland at the 2016 Summer Olympics in Rio de Janeiro, Brazil as an amateur.

Boxing career
Donnelly represented Northern Ireland at the 2010 Commonwealth Games  held in New Delhi, India. Competing in the light welterweight division he faced Australian Luke Woods in the first round and was eliminated from the competition after a 0–10 loss. Following his defeat Donnelly was subsequently sent home from the Games by team management after drinking alcohol and causing a disturbance in the athlete's village. After this he became disillusioned with the sport and quit boxing for two years before eventually returning to the All Saints Boxing Club in Ballymena.

At the 2014 Commonwealth Games held in Glasgow, Scotland, Donnelly was again selected for the Northern Ireland team. Competing in the welterweight division he defeated Hasan Asif of Pakistan in the round of 32, Oscar Finau of Tonga in the round of 16 and Canadian Custio Clayton in the quarterfinals. In his semifinal Donnelly was beaten on a split judge's decision by India’s Mandeep Jangra, meaning he finished with a bronze medal.

Donnelly took part in the 2015 World Series of Boxing, representing the Polish Hussars team. He won five of his six fights, beating Kazakhstan's Madiyar Ashkeyev, Brian Ceballo of the United States, Puerto Rican Nicklaus Flaz Guillen, Alberto Palmetta of Argentina and Italy's Dario Morello, but was defeated by Venezuelan Gabriel Maestre and suffered a walkover defeat after visa issues meant he was unable to travel to fight Azerbaijan's Parviz Baghirov.

Donnelly qualified to represent Ireland in the men's welterweight event at the 2016 Summer Olympics to be held in Rio de Janeiro, Brazil, via his fourth-place ranking in the World Series of Boxing. Only the top two ranked athletes were due to qualify through the rankings but two of the athletes ranked ahead of him qualified by alternate methods,  Morocco’s Mohammad Rabii secured his place through the 2015 AIBA World Boxing Championships and Andrey Zamkovoy  won the Russian championships to confirm his place.

Professional boxing record

|Win
|9-0
|align=left| Pavel Albrecht
|
|
|
|align=left| Brentwood Centre, Brentwood, England
|
|- align=center
|Win
|8-0
|align=left| Lenny Fuller
|
|
|
|align=left| Indigo at the O2, Greenwich, England
|
|- align=center
|Win
|7-0
|align=left| Sean Robinson
|
|
|
|align=left| Indigo at the O2, Greenwich, England
|
|- align=center
|Win
|6-0
|align=left| Ish O'Connor
|
|
|
|align=left| Indigo at the O2, Greenwich, England
|
|- align=center
|Win
|5-0
|align=left| Edwin Palacios
|
|
|
|align=left| Ulster Hall, Belfast, Northern Ireland
|
|- align=center
|Win
|4–0
|align=left| Ray Cervera
|
|
|
|align=left| Madison Square Garden, New York, United States
|
|- align=center
|Win
|3–0
|align=left| Aryvdas Trizno
|
|
|
|align=left| Titanic Exhibition Centre, Belfast, Northern Ireland
|
|- align=center
|Win
|2–0
|align=left| Miguel Aguilar
|
|
|
|align=left| Arena Birmingham, Birmingham, England
|
|- align=center
|Win
|1–0
|align=left| Kevin McCauley
|
|
|
|align=left| Windsor Park, Belfast, Northern Ireland
|

Personal life
Donnelly was born in Ballymena, Northern Ireland. In December 2022, he was sentenced to probation and community service after being found guilty of sexual assault in an October 2021 incident in Ballymena.

References

External links

Living people
1988 births
Boxers at the 2010 Commonwealth Games
Boxers at the 2014 Commonwealth Games
Boxers at the 2018 Commonwealth Games
Commonwealth Games bronze medallists for Northern Ireland
Irish male boxers
Male boxers from Northern Ireland
Sportspeople from Ballymena
Olympic boxers of Ireland
Boxers at the 2016 Summer Olympics
Commonwealth Games medallists in boxing
Middleweight boxers
Medallists at the 2014 Commonwealth Games
Medallists at the 2018 Commonwealth Games